The 2010 World Women's Curling Championship (branded as 2010 Ford World Women's Curling Championship for sponsorship reasons) was held from March 20 to 28 at the Credit Union iPlex in Swift Current, Saskatchewan, Canada.

Qualification
 (host country)
 (defending champion)
 (Pacific runner-up)
 (Americas region)
Eight teams from the 2009 European Curling Championships:
 
 
 
 
 
 
 
  (defeated  in best-of-three World Challenge series)

Teams
The teams were as listed below:

* Stella Heiß and Corinna Scholz alternated in the lead position.
** Anna Sidorova replaced Ludmila Privivkova as skip after Draw 2. Privivkova became the alternate, while Margarita Fomina replaced Sidorova in the third position.

Round robin standings

*First Appearance

Round robin results
All draw times listed are in Central Standard Time (UTC−6).

Draw 1
Saturday, March 20, 14:00

Draw 2
Saturday, March 20, 19:00

Draw 3
Sunday, March 21 8:30

Draw 4
Sunday, March 21, 13:30

Draw 5
Sunday, March 21, 19:00

Draw 6
Monday, March 22, 8:30

Draw 7
Monday, March 22, 13:30

Draw 8
Monday, March 22, 19:30

Draw 9
Tuesday, March 23, 8:30

Draw 10
Tuesday, March 23, 13:30

Draw 11
Tuesday, March 23, 19:30

Draw 12
Wednesday, March 24, 8:30

Draw 13
Wednesday, March 24, 13:30

Draw 14
Wednesday, March 24, 19:30

Draw 15
Thursday, March 25, 8:30

Draw 16
Thursday, March 25, 13:30

Draw 17
Thursday, March 25, 19:30

Tie-breaker
Friday, March 26, 12:30

Playoffs

1 vs. 2
Friday, March 26, 8:00 pm

3 vs. 4
Saturday, March 27, 12:00

Semifinal
Saturday, March 27, 17:00

Bronze medal game
Sunday, March 28, 10:00 am

Gold medal game
Sunday, March 28, 15:00

Top five player percentages
The top five player percentages for each position:

References
 General
 
 Specific

External links
 

World Women's Curling Championship
Curling
Swift Current
Curling in Saskatchewan
March 2010 sports events in Canada
2010 in women's curling
Women's curling competitions in Canada
2010 in Canadian women's sports
2010 in Saskatchewan
Sports competitions in Saskatchewan
International sports competitions hosted by Canada